Joghatai (also Romanized as Joghatāy and Jaghatāi) is a city and capital of Joghatai County, in Razavi Khorasan Province, Iran. It is named after Chagatai Khan, second son of Genghis Khan.  At the 2006 census, its population was 6,027, in 1,636 families.

References 

Populated places in Joghatai County
Cities in Razavi Khorasan Province